"She Has to Be Loved" is a song by New Zealand singer-songwriter Jenny Morris. It was released in August 1989 as the second single from her second studio album, Shiver (1989). It became her most successful song in her home country, reaching number three on the RIANZ Singles Chart. It also entered the top five in Australia, reaching number five and becoming her highest-peaking hit there until 1991, when "Break in the Weather" reached number two.

Track listings
7-inch and cassette single
 "She Has to Be Loved" – 4:05
 "Conscience" – 2:32

12-inch single
 "She Has to Be Loved" (extended mix) – 6:18
 "She Has to Be Loved" – 4:05
 "Conscience" – 2:32

Mini-CD single
 "She Has to Be Loved" – 4:05
 "Conscience" – 2:32
 "She Has to Be Loved" (extended mix) – 6:18

Charts

Weekly charts

Year-end charts

Certifications

References

External links
 

1989 songs
1989 singles
Capitol Records singles
Jenny Morris (musician) songs
Songs written by Andrew Farriss